Pierce Gagnon (born July 25, 2005) is an American actor. He is known for his roles in the film Looper and in the CBS series Extant, as well as voicing Tim Templeton in the Netflix series The Boss Baby: Back in Business.

Personal life
Gagnon was born on July 25, 2005, in Atlanta, Georgia. He has three younger siblings, including his brother Steele. He resides in Los Angeles.

Career
Gagnon played Logan Evans, the son of Clay Evans (Robert Buckley), in season 9 of the CW drama series One Tree Hill.

In January 2011, he was cast in the action thriller film Looper as Cid Harrington, a child with unusual telekinetic abilities, who becomes a warlord called the "Rainmaker". Rian Johnson said, "Looking back I'm kind of terrified that I hinged the success of the backend of the movie on finding someone like Pierce. It's really rare to find a kid who can do what he does. He would do three-page dialogue scenes with Emily [Blunt] and Joe [Gordon-Levitt] and hold his own against them all the way through."

After voicing Tiago in Rio 2, the sequel to the 2011 film Rio, Gagnon played Tucker Bloom in the comedy-drama film Wish I Was Here. He played Ethan Woods, the android son of Molly Woods (Halle Berry), in the CBS science fiction drama series Extant. Gagnon was named one of the best actors under twenty years of age.

In 2017, he played Sonny Jim Jones, the son of Dougie and Jane Jones (Naomi Watts), in the Showtime series Twin Peaks. From 2018 to 2020, he has voiced the character of Tim Templeton on the Netflix animated series The Boss Baby: Back in Business.

In 2020, Gagnon voiced the role of Young Fred Jones in the Scooby-Doo film Scoob!. He was set to reprise the role in the  film Scoob: Holiday Haunt, which was set for release in 2022 on HBO Max, but it was canceled in August 2022.

Filmography

Film

Television

References

External links
 
 

2005 births
21st-century American male actors
American male child actors
American male film actors
American male television actors
Living people
Male actors from Atlanta